"Hungry Eyes" is a song by Eric Carmen

Hungry Eyes may also refer to:

"Hungry Eyes" (Merle Haggard song)
Hungry Eyes (film)
"Hungry Eyes" (D:TNG episode)